Steven Marrs (born March 11, 1967 in Landstuhl, Germany) is the founder, President and Managing Partner of OutEast Entertainment,  an independent multimedia entertainment studio.

Career 
Marrs was the co-founder, President & COO of Tribal DDB, a worldwide internet services company which is part of the Omnicom Group. Prior to Tribal DDB, he was a partner at an internet advertising agency and entertainment company, Blue Marble A.C.G.

Marrs was the founder and owner of Branded Pictures, formerly Brand Entertainment Studios, an independent cross platform production and distribution company that was folded into Momentum Entertainment Group at its inception. He was the executive producer of such shows as NBC's World Music Awards, CW's Sean Combs presents Americas Party, and CBS' Christmas from Central Park as well as several cable, live event and internet shows, including Comedy Hall of Fame on ABC, Got Game on Spike, and Anatomy of An Awkward Situation.

Marrs was the Founder and President of Momentum Entertainment Group part of the Momentum Worldwide group of companies owned by Interpublic Group. Under Marrs' leadership, MEG launched scripted, reality and special series and programs including Rogue, Full Circle, Croc Files, How Sweet the Sound, the award-winning PG&E Energy House Calls Digital Series and Elite Model Look. In February 2013, Marrs and Momentum parted ways.

OutEast Entertainment was launched in November 2013 with its first script-to-series drama project with The CW Network titled, The Cover and the scripted drama series titled Ashley Madison. The company announced its first foray into the unscripted television business with the acquisition of the Dutch format Fish Tales.

Early life 
Raised in New Orleans, Louisiana, Marrs is a 1991 graduate of the University of Florida, where he majored in advertising. He is the son of Cynthia H. Marrs, a noted New Orleans entrepreneur.

References

External links 

1967 births
Living people
American television producers
American advertising executives
Businesspeople from New Orleans
University of Florida alumni
American chief operating officers